Libythea laius, the lobed beak, is a member of the butterfly subfamily Libytheinae found in East Africa, Madagascar, southern India, and Sri Lanka. It was described by Roland Trimen in 1879.

Libythea laius was formerly considered a synonym of Libythea labdaca, which has similar dorsal wing markings, but it differs from that species in that the rectangular orange mark in the discal cell apex is fused to or separated from the discal cell base.

Subspecies

Libythea laius laius Trimen, 1879 (eastern and southern Africa, including Kenya, Malawi, Mozambique, South Africa, Sudan, Tanzania, and Zimbabwe)
Libythea laius lepitoides Moore, 1903 (southern India and Sri Lanka)
 
Libythea laius tsiandava Grose-Smith 1891 (Madagascar)

References

External links
"Libythea laius Trimen 1879". Tree of Life Web Project.
"Libythea laius Trimen, 1879 – Lobed Beak". Butterflies of India

Butterflies described in 1879
Libythea